Doctor Cine Actor is a 1982 Indian Telugu-language comedy drama film directed by Vijaya Nirmala. Produced by Nara Naryana Combines, it stars Krishna in a triple role alongside Jayasudha and Kavitha. The film has music composed by K. Chakravarthy. 

Doctor Cine Actor was released on 9 April 1982. It was moderately successful at the box office.

Plot
Madhu is a talented doctor who earns several laurels with his research. He strives to make his cousin Raju a doctor like him but Raju is interested only in films. Raju also wins a prize by portraying Chatrapati Sivaji in a play. When Madhu insults Raju for wasting his time, depressed Raju leaves the home. Raju's childhood sweetheart Radha provides gives him money to move to Madras.  

Raju struggles a lot in Madras for opportunities. One day, he manages to get a small role and uses the opportunity to the fullest. He soon rises to become a bonafide star and earns millions of rupees. Meanwhile, film director Srikanth's wife and popular actress Ranjani try to get close to Raju. Raju, however, rejects her advances and marries Radha. Madhu also gets married to Latha. Slowly, Madhu and Raju cope with each other. Following a ghastly incident, Raju hands over his baby boy to Madhu and Radha to look after it.

Srikanth and Rajani scheme and manage to get Raju on board for their next film. While Rajani lusts for Raju, Srikanth intends to damage his career. Raju realizes this and punishes them for their sins, and returns home.

Cast 
 Krishna as Triple role Madhu (doctor), Raju (aspiring actor) Chatrapati Sivaji(cameo)
 Jayasudha as Radha
 Kavitha as Latha
 Kaikala Satyanarayana as Srikanth
 Allu Ramalingaiah
 Narasimha Raju
 Ravikanth
 Ch. Krishna Murthy
 Vallam Narasimha Rao
 Subhashini as Ranjana
 Mamatha
 Suryakantham
 Pushpa Kumari
 Kakinada Shyamala
 Geetha
 K.J. Saradhi
 Kanta Rao
 Nagesh
 Mada
 Jagga Rao
 Thota Subbarao

Cameo appearances
 N. T. Rama Rao as himself
 D. Ramanaidu as himself 
 Dasari Narayana Rao as himself

Production 
The film marks Krishna's second appearance in a triple role. He plays a son and nephew who look alike. The film has score and soundtrack composed by K. Chakravarthy. The lyrics were written by Veturi and Appalacharya, with vocals by S. P. Balasubrahmanyam, P. Susheela and S. Janaki.

Reception 
Reviewing the film for Andhra Patrika on 14 April 1982, C. S. B. appreciated the performances and technical aspects, adding that: "Direction by Vijaya Nirmala appeals to all sections of audience." Gudipoodi Srihari of Sitara maganize on the review dated 25 April 1982, called the Doctor Cine Actor "a film within a film." Srihari felt that the focus was more on the actor part, and a few scenes were unnecessary as they dragged the screenplay.

References

External links 
 

1980s Telugu-language films
1982 drama films
Films scored by K. Chakravarthy
Indian drama films
Films directed by Vijaya Nirmala